The Return to Darkness is the third full-length album by the Indian death metal band Demonic Resurrection. It was released on January 15, 2010 through Demonstealer Records. The band was signed to Candlelight Records for worldwide distribution. The album was released on Candlelight Records on July 12, 2010.

Reception

The album has mostly received positive reviews. Critics have praised the band for improving upon their sound, stating, "...better production, tighter songwriting, better sounding symphonic elements and overall, a much more mature sound.". Critics also praised the atmosphere of the album. Some critics felt that the album was a touch derivative but nonetheless praised it for solid execution.

Track listing

Personnel
Sahil 'Demonstealer' Makhija - lead vocals, rhythm guitar, band leader
Daniel Rego - lead guitar, backing vocals
Husain Bandukwala - bass
Mephisto - keyboards
Virendra 'Viru' Kaith - drums

Additional Personnel
Sahil 'Demonstealer' Makhija - producer
Zorran Mendonsa - Mastering

References

External links

2010 albums
Demonic Resurrection albums